Emmanuel Christian Academy (ECA) is a private Christian school located in Springfield, Ohio that has a total enrollment of 260-300 students in pre-kindergarten through 12th grade. Most of the students are from Champaign County, Ohio and Clark County, Ohio.

Emmanuel teaches conservative Bible education classes at all grade levels and holds weekly chapel services for students.

The school's motto is "Preparing Leaders to Impact the World".

References

External links
Emmanuel Christian Academy

Christian schools in Ohio
Nondenominational Christian schools in the United States
High schools in Clark County, Ohio
Private high schools in Ohio
Private middle schools in Ohio
Private elementary schools in Ohio
1997 establishments in Ohio